The Edderkoppen Theatre is a theatre located at  St Olavs Plass in Oslo, Norway.  The theatre is known for varied entertainment, ranging from comedy to musical shows.  From 1967 to 2003 it was called the ABC theatre. Since 2016, it has been known as Edderkoppen Scene.

History
The theatre premiered on 3 September 1942 at a different venue. It turned out that the theater auditorium was too small, and in 1945 moved to St. Olav's place. Einar Schanke (1927–1992) took over as theatre director and theatrical producer in 1967, and the theater changed its name to the ABC theater. The theater, however, retained its traditions under Schanke's management. In 1992 Schanke died, and Tom Sterri, Ketil Aamodt and Anders Moland took over.

In 1999 the theatre was destroyed by a powerful explosion. A real estate company that owned a nearby hotel purchased the property. The company committed itself at the same time to rebuild the theatre. In autumn 2003, reconstruction had finished, and the theatre was returned  to its original name, Edderkoppen. In December 2014, ownership transfers operations to Scandic Hotels and after extensive renovation, opened the stage in May 2016 with a new name; Edderkoppen Scene.

The new building has 600 seats and offers entertainment, dining and accommodation all in the same building. t is also a popular venue for conferences and events.   I

Productions:  2003-2008

 2003: På nett med byen
 2004: På nett med byen
 2004: Joe Labero: Expect the unexpected
 2004: Elling og Kjell Bjarne
 2004: 80-tallet Beat for beat
 2004: No e dde jul igjen
 2005: På rad og rike
 2005: Boogie Nights
 2005: Raske Menn: The Fast Show
 2005: Tommy og Jan Werner - The Show
 2005: No e dde jul igjen
 2006: Raske Menn: The Fast Show
 2006: Ladies Night
 2006: Ole Paus og Lill Lindfors: En juleforestilling
 2006: A merry little christmas
 2007: Ladies Night
 2007: Hair
 2007: Bettan og Bøfjerdingan
 2007: Dansefeber sceneshow
 2007: Fanget på nettet
 2007: Ylvis III
 2008: Sound of Music

References

External links
 Edderkoppen Scene official site

Theatres in Oslo
Theatres completed in 2003
1942 establishments in Norway